The S&P MidCap 400 Index, more commonly known as the S&P 400, is a stock market index from S&P Dow Jones Indices. The index serves as a gauge for the U.S. mid-cap equities sector and is the most widely followed mid-cap index. 

To be included in the index, a stock must have a total market capitalization that ranges from $4.6 billion to $12.7 billion. These market cap eligibility criteria are for addition to an index, not for continued membership. As a result, an index constituent that appears to violate criteria for addition to that index is not removed unless ongoing conditions warrant an index change.

Additionally , same as S&P 500 and S&P 600, there is a financial viability requirement. Companies must have positive as-reported earnings over the most recent quarter, as well as over the most recent four quarters (summed together).

, the median market cap was $5.77 billion with the market cap of the largest company in the index at nearly $18.6 billion and the smallest company at $1.6 billion. The index's market cap covers nearly 7 percent of the total US stock market.

Record values

Investing
The following exchange-traded funds (ETFs) attempt to track this index and sub-indexes:

Index Fund
 SPDR S&P MidCap 400 ETF
 Vanguard S&P Mid-Cap 400 ETF
 iShares Core S&P Mid-Cap ETF

Growth Index Fund
 SPDR S&P 400 Mid Cap Growth ETF
 Vanguard S&P Mid-Cap 400 Growth ETF
 iShares S&P Mid-Cap 400 Growth ETF

Value Index Fund
 SPDR S&P 400 Mid Cap Value ETF
 Vanguard S&P Mid-Cap 400 Value ETF
 iShares S&P Mid-Cap 400 Value ETF

The SPDR fund was first, but the iShares fund is bigger; also they have different structures.

Versions
The "S&P 400" generally quoted is a price return index; there are also "total return" and "net total return" versions of the index. These versions differ in how dividends are accounted for. The price return version does not account for dividends; it only captures the changes in the prices of the index components. The total return version reflects the effects of dividend reinvestment. Finally, the net total return version reflects the effects of dividend reinvestment after the deduction of withholding tax.

Annual returns

Components

See also

S&P 1500
 S&P 500
 S&P 600
 Russell Midcap Index

References

0400
American stock market indices